Inikkum Ilamai is a 1979 Indian Tamil-language film, directed by M. A. Kaja, starring Sudhakar and Raadhika. It was released on 16 March 1979. The film was Vijayakanth's debut film as a villain. The film failed at the box office.

Plot

Cast 
 Sudhakar
 Raadhika as Lakshmi
 Vijayakanth as Arun
 V. K. Ramasamy
 Ganthimathi
 Usilaimani
 Pakoda Kadhar

Soundtrack 
All songs were written by Alangudi Somu, M. A. Kaja and Pulavar Maari, and composed by Shankar–Ganesh.

Reception
Kausikan of Kalki panned the film for its vulgarity and concluded that the film causes bitterness and anguish that so much of color film is wasted.

References

External links 
 

1970s Tamil-language films
1979 films
Films scored by Shankar–Ganesh